A potbelly stove is a cast-iron, coal-burning or wood-burning stove that is cylindrical with a bulge in the middle. The name is derived from the resemblance of the stove to a fat man's pot belly. Potbelly stoves were used to heat large rooms and were often found in train stations or one-room schoolhouses. The flat top of the stove allows for cooking food or heating water.

See also

Delamere Francis McCloskey, Los Angeles City Council member, 1941–43, rescued potbelly stoves for use in air-raid defense posts
Franklin stove
List of stoves
Red Cross stove

References

Heaters
Fireplaces
Residential heating appliances
Stoves